Francis Thuo Karanja (born 6 April 1975) is a Kenyan Paralympian athlete  competing mainly in category T11 long-distance events.

He competed in the 2008 Summer Paralympics in Beijing, China.  There he won a silver medal in the men's 5000 metres - T11 event, went out in the first round of the men's 1500 metres - T11 event and finished fifth in the men's 10000 metres - T12 event

External links
 

Paralympic athletes of Kenya
Athletes (track and field) at the 2008 Summer Paralympics
Athletes (track and field) at the 2012 Summer Paralympics
Paralympic silver medalists for Kenya
Living people
1975 births
Medalists at the 2008 Summer Paralympics
Paralympic medalists in athletics (track and field)
Kenyan male long-distance runners